Frederick Baumann (1765/1770 - 1845) was a Polish architect and sculptor-decorator during the Classical and Romantic periods. He and his son Anthony worked in Łańcut. He performed numerous renovations and other work in Lviv.

References
 Joseph Piotrowski, in Polish Biographical Dictionary. T. 1 Kraków: Polish Academy of Learning - Main Ingredients in bookstores Gebethner and Wolff, 1935, pp. 365–366. Reprint: Department of National Theatre. Ossolińskich, Kraków 1989, 

Polish sculptors
Polish male sculptors
19th-century Polish architects
1845 deaths
Year of birth uncertain
People from Łańcut